HCSA may refer to:

 Hate Crime Statistics Act, A United States congress Act to provide for the acquisition and publication of data about crimes that manifest prejudice based on certain group characteristics
 HC Sierre-Anniviers, a Swiss ice hockey team
 Health Care Spending Account, a Canadian employee health benefit plan
 Hospital Consultants and Specialists Association, A professional body in the UK specifically designed for senior hospital doctors